Chromotype may refer to:

Photo-crayotype
Chromotypograph